David J. Deming is an American economist and Professor of Public Policy at the Harvard Kennedy School, Professor of Education and Economics at the Harvard Graduate School of Education, Director of the Malcolm Wiener Center for Social Policy, His research focuses on the economics of education in general and the impact of education policies on long-run non-test score outcomes. In 2018, David Deming received the David N. Kershaw Award and Prize from the Association for Public Policy Analysis and Management for his work in the areas of secondary education, vocational training and skills.

Biography

David Deming earned a B.S. in economics and a B.A. in political science from Ohio State University in 2002, followed by a M.P.P. from UC Berkeley's Goldman School of Public Policy in 2005 and a Ph.D. in Public Policy from the Harvard Kennedy School (HKS) in 2010. After his Ph.D., Deming joined Carnegie Mellon University as assistant professor of public policy and economics before moving to the Harvard Graduate School of Education (HGSE) as assistant and later as associate professor. Since 2016, Deming has been a full professor of both HGSE and HKS. Moreover, he became director of the Malcolm Wiener Center for Social Policy at HKS in 2019. He is affiliated with the National Bureau of Economic Research, CESifo, and J-PAL, and is a Principal Investigator of the CLIMB Initiative, which seeks to use big data analysis to identify higher education policies and programmes in support of students.

Research

David Deming's research interests centres on the economics of education, with a focus on early childhood, primary and secondary education as well as the long-term non-test score outcomes of education policies. Key findings of his research include:

Concerning early childhood education, Deming has studied the impact of Head Start, finding that participants gain 0.23 SD on a summary index of young adult outcomes, which closes one-third of the gap between children from the median and bottom quartile family income. In earlier research with Susan Dynarski, he has also highlighted criticized redshirting, i.e., the continuously increasing practice of postponing the entry of children into school, arguing that little evidence supports the notion that doing so benefits children and some evidence suggests that redshirting reduces educational attainment by increasing high school dropout rates and depresses lifetime earnings by delaying entry into the labour market.

In research with Dynarski on the link between college costs and educational attainment, she highlights the potential of college costs to depress college entry and persistence, arguing that simple and transparent programmes in general and programmes linking money to incentives and/or the takeup of academic support services in particular appear to be most effective.

Deming estimated that, in North Carolina,  giving students and their families the choice which secondary school they attend substantially helped to reduce crime and incarceration rates among those given the choice, with the impacts being concentrated among high-risk youth whose propensity to become criminal and to commit severe crimes is cut by about half. In further work with Thomas Kane, Douglas Staiger and Judith Hastings, Deming finds that giving such the choice of school to students and their families induces them to generally choose public schools that are generally of higher quality, which in turn tends to raise girls' college attainment as these are most likely to benefit from improved learning environments.

Together with Claudia Goldin and Lawrence F. Katz, Deming has  investigated the for-profit sector of U.S. higher education, observing that for-profit students are comparatively more likely to be unemployed or "idle" and to earn less after graduation as well as to have far higher default rates on their student loans relative to comparable students from non-profit institutions; by contrast, for-profits tend to educate a larger fraction of minority, disadvantaged and older student and are more successful in first-year student retention and AA and certificate level completion. In further research with them as well as with Noam Yuchtman and Amira Abulafi, Deming finds that a business bachelor's degree from a for-profit online institution is 22% less likely to receive a callback from an employer than one from a nonselective public institution, especially in the absence of external quality indicators. Examining whether online learning technologies have helped decrease prices in higher education, they find that real and relative prices for full-time undergraduate online education has fallen between 2006 and 2013, raising hopes that edtech can "bend the cost curve" of U.S. higher education, although they caution that the impact of online learning on education quality remains uncertain.

Relative to the 1980s and 1990s, the U.S. labour market increasingly rewarded social skills in the 2010s, especially in combination with math skills, which Deming attributes to social skills reducing coordination costs and enabling worker specialization and cooperation.

Honors 

Deming has performed editorial duties for the Journal of Human Resources, American Economic Journal: Economic Policy and the American Economic Journal: Applied Economics. 
In 2018, his research was awarded the David N. Kershaw Award and Prize by the Association for Public Policy Analysis and Management.

References

External links

 Homepage of David Deming
 Webpage of David Deming on the website of Harvard University
 Google Scholar page of David Deming

Living people
Education economists
Harvard Graduate School of Education faculty
Harvard Kennedy School faculty
Ohio State University College of Arts and Sciences alumni
Harvard Kennedy School alumni
Goldman School of Public Policy alumni
American economists
Year of birth missing (living people)